The men's 100 metre freestyle event at the 2020 Summer Olympics was held from 27 to 29 July 2021 at the Tokyo Aquatics Centre. There were approximately 60 competitors from approximately 45 nations, with the ultimate numbers determined through the ongoing selection process, including universality places.

The medals for the competition were presented by Dick Pound, Canada; IOC Member, and the medalists' bouquets were presented by Dr. Mohamed Diop, Senegal; FINA Bureau Member.

Background

It was the event's 28th appearance, having been held at every edition except 1900.

Defending champion Kyle Chalmers of Australia is expected to return, as are fifth-place finisher Duncan Scott of Great Britain and sixth-place finisher Caeleb Dressel of the United States. Dressel is the two-time reigning World Champion (2017 and 2019), with Chalmers the runner-up in 2019.

Qualification

 
The Olympic Qualifying Time for the event is 48.57 seconds. Up to two swimmers per National Olympic Committee (NOC) can automatically qualify by swimming that time at an approved qualification event. The Olympic Selection Time is 50.03 seconds. Up to one swimmer per NOC meeting that time is eligible for selection, allocated by world ranking until the maximum quota for all swimming events is reached. NOCs without a male swimmer qualified in any event can also use their universality place.

Competition format

The competition consists of three rounds: heats, semifinals, and a final. The swimmers with the best 16 times in the heats advance to the semifinals. The swimmers with the best 8 times in the semifinals advance to the final. Swim-offs are used as necessary to break ties for advancement to the next round.

Records
Prior to this competition, the existing world and Olympic records were as follows.

The following record was established during the competition:

Schedule
The schedule is a three-day schedule, with each round on separate days.

All times are Japan Standard Time (UTC+9)

Results

Heats
The swimmers with the top 16 times, regardless of heat, advance to the semifinals.

Semifinals
The swimmers with the best 8 times, regardless of heat, advanced to the final.

Final

References

Men's 00100 metre freestyle
Olympics
Men's events at the 2020 Summer Olympics